The Logo Islands are the two identical artificial islands built in the shape a palm leaf. The islands were built of 4.9 million cubic feet of sand. The design is the logo of the LOGO Palm Developers. Emaar Development has taken possession of one of the islands (the Logo island situated to the west of The Palm Jumeirah) for the construction of its Beach Vista residences project on what will be called Emaar Beachfront Island. Located in its Emaar Beachfront island development, Beach Vista is a twin-tower development of 33-storeys and 26-storeys with one-to-four-bedroom apartments.

See also
Palm Islands

References

Realestate.theemiratesnetwork.com
Weknowdubai.com

Nakheel Properties
Artificial islands of Dubai